The blind mole (Talpa caeca), also known as the Mediterranean mole, is a mole found in the Mediterranean region. It is similar to the European mole, differing most prominently in having eyes covered with skin. It is found in Albania, France, Greece, Italy, Monaco, Montenegro, San Marino, Serbia, Slovenia, Switzerland, and Turkey. It is typically carnivorous in nature. Individuals can grow up to 12 cm in length.

References

Talpa
Taxonomy articles created by Polbot
Mammals described in 1822
Taxa named by Paolo Savi